The Gaoligong pika (Ochotona gaoligongensis) is a species of mammal in the family Ochotonidae. It is endemic to China. Many of the general physical characteristics of the pika species, are shared by Gaoligong pikas. However, the Gaoligong pika is specifically characterized by unique physical characteristics, including a red-brown colored crown around the neck and black behind the ears. They can produce one litter per year and can live up to three years. Their behavior is currently undetermined due to limited information available about the species. This is due to the inaccessibility of their habitat.

Evolution and classification
The family Ochotonidae includes over 30 different species  of territorial, small-bodied herbivore species of pikas, including the Gaoligong pika. Because of their resemblance and similar characteristics, pikas are considered to have diverged from the same lineage as that of the Leporidae. There are evolutionary appearances that have been connected to each specific group of pikas within the family, during the Pliocene and Pleistocene periods. Ochotonids share very similar physical characteristics, which have made it nearly impossible to order them according to their taxonomy. However, there are three main subgroups of pikas, in which each classification of pikas has been organized based on their location and physical characteristics. Particularly for the Gaoligong pika, their classification falls under the subgroup of mountain pikas. This classification extends far into the subgenus of the Conothoa, which is one of the three main subgenera each subgroup is divided into. The appearance of the Gaoligong pikas is dated back to the late Pliocene period, where other Ochotona species emerged, including but not limited to: Ochotona brookei, Ochotona forresti, Ochotona gloveri, and Ochotona himalayana. Within the pika group, there is high exhibition of intraspecific morphological diversity versus low interspecific diversity, thus the emergence of several subgroups. The emergence of different types of species, including the Gaoligong pika and those unknown today, have been traced back to the appearance of the K/T boundary, making the family Ochotonidae less rich in species when compared to other families of the superorder Glires.

Groups
There are three families within the order Lagomorpha, the families Ochotonidae, Leporidae, and Prolagidae. The group pikas, which belongs to the family Ochotonidae, consists of over thirty different pika species. Amongst these species, there is a division of subgroups and subgenera, including the subgroups of the northern pikas, shrub-steppe pikas, and the mountain pikas. These subgroups belong to individual and different subgenera, including the Pika, Ochotona, and Conothoa. The Gaoligong pika belongs to the subgenus Conothoa and subgroup of mountain pikas. The subgenus Conothoa and subgroup of mountain pikas also includes, but is not limited to: 
Forrest's pika Ochotona forresti 
Glover's pika Ochotona gloveri 
Himalayan pika  Ochotona himalayana 
Large-eared pika Ochotona macrotis 
All of these subgroups and subgenera share the same general physical characteristics of the family Ochotonidae, including the Gaoligong pika. However, there are several distinct physical attributions that set the Gaoligong pika apart from the other subgroups.

Characteristics
The Gaoligong pika shares a range of general physical characteristics as those of the family Ochotonidae. Some of the general characteristics include the physical attribution of their small body. They have prominent ears at the top of the head and share a common characteristic of no visible tail. One of the primary physical characteristics of the Gaoligong pika group is the display of a red-brown color crown around the neck and head of the pika, as well as a black shade of color in the back of the ears. Often the size of head-body length in pikas reaches an average of 285 mm (6- 10 inches in length), with ears around greater than 40 mm. Additionally, the Gaoligong pika has a palatal-incisive foramen that is violin-shaped. Other physical characteristics include: 
Two upper premolars 
Large bullae 
Lack of vacuities at the anterior end of frontal bones
Fattened skull profile 
Broad condylar process of the mandible  
Most often the physical characteristics of the Pika species are compared to the family Leporidae, which includes rabbits and hares. The comparisons of the family Ochotonidae with those of the family Leporidae are due to the very similar physical characteristics shared by Pikas, rabbits and hares. However, there is a distinction between each, including size of the body and skeletal structure of each family, as well as distinctive characteristics in the length of the ears. A skeletal distinction can be seen in the Gaoligong Pika which lacks a supraorbital process in the skull skeletal feature and have a long and broad posterior nasal bone.

Habitat and distribution
China is home to the Ochotona gaoligongensis, Gaoligong Pika, where it lives in a meadow-like habitat. Its locality includes, Gaoligong Mountains, located northwest of the Yunnan Province, China, where their name derives. Pikas primarily live in habitats which consist of leaves and grass. They are usually found in mountain terrains at high altitudes and in talus slopes and rock boulders. Primarily, due to this type of habitat of the Gaoligong pikas, there is a limited amount of information about their group. Within the family Ochotonidae however, there is a total of 24 species of pikas found also in China, generally in steppe and alpine environments. However, Ochotonids were once also found in a range of other locations, such as Asia, Europe, North America and northern Africa. The locations of Ochotonids have changed over the course of time and are now found primarily in Asia and North America.

It is a rarely found, one of the six pika species endemic to central China, with no true population studies.

Behavior
Currently the behavior of Gaoligong pikas is unknown, however it has been compared to the Ochotona forresti, Forrest's pika. The absences of information known about Gaoligong Pikas may be due to the range of access their habitat has to offer. The behavior of the Gaoligong Pika shares similar general behavioral traits of the pika family, including characteristics from the Asian meadow-dwelling Pika species. The meadow-dwelling species of pikas displays more social behavior amongst members of the same species group and their families. Unlike the Asian meadow-dwelling species, some pikas, such as the northern American pika, are typically very defensive in regards to their habitat and communicate through vocal projections in a whistle-like manner. They are often found in a solitary state, except during mating periods. Because of the importance of keeping their habitat defended against other Pikas and predators, when one species of Pika encounters another or the same, it often leads to aggressive interactions. There is great diversity between the behaviors of some groups of Pikas than others. Each group of pikas ultimately behaves depending on the location and environmental factors that play into role in the geographical habitat they are located at. Generally Pikas are most active during the morning and late afternoon. They follow a diurnal pattern within their system, which makes them more energy efficient during some periods of the day. Additionally, Pikas do not hibernate during the winter, making them highly dependent on environmental and habitat factors. During the winter time, Pikas must use tunnels as means of targeting food during those periods of the seasons. Pikas store sun-dried summer harvest plants within the tunnels. This brings the mortality rate of the pika species higher than other animal species that do not hibernate during the winter season, due to the dependence of habitat and environmental factors for the supply of food.

Conservation
Information available about the Gaoligong pika group is restrictive and has therefore not been assigned to a threat category under The IUCN Red List of Threatened Species. Currently the family Ochotonidae has been labeled as critically endangered. Factors that have contributed to the endangerment of pikas include: climate change, loss of habitat, as well as, on several occasions, poisoning. Because of the climate change, especially during warming summers, the mortality rate of Ochotonids has drastically increased over the years. The conservation status of the Gaoligong pika is yet to be determined, however based on information obtained about the overall pika species, the Gaoligong pika may be one of the many pika groups that are critically endangered.

Reproduction
There is no information in regards to the reproduction phase of the Gaoligong Pika group, due to the accessibility of their habitat, in order to be observed and studied further. However, it is considered to presumably follow similar reproductive characteristics of the family Ochotonidae. The family Ochotonidae has a gestation period of about 25–30 days. Female Pikas give birth after a month of gestation and stay with their young for the first month of their life. Pikas can carry from two to three litters of leverets every year, however because of their dependence on environmental factors and survival, especially during the winter, the survival of more than one litter is not probable. During the beginning of the spring season Pikas begin mating, once the winter season is over, marked by the melting of the snow. Pikas can begin mating at the age of one year and can live up to 3–4 years. However, Pikas do not spend much of their life mating, as mating does not occur till the spring season of each year. When Leverets are born they appear to have a minimal amount of fur and a full set of teeth. They remain with their eyes close up until the 9th day after their birth.

See also
 Gaoligong Mountains

References

Notes

Bibliography

Mammals of China
Pikas
Mammals described in 1988
Taxonomy articles created by Polbot